Narayan Swaroop Sharma was an Indian politician. He was elected to the Lok Sabha, the lower house of the Parliament of India from Domariyaganj, Uttar Pradesh as a member of the Bharatiya Jana Sangh.

References

External links
 Official Biographical Sketch in Lok Sabha Website
1930 births
Bharatiya Jana Sangh politicians
Lok Sabha members from Uttar Pradesh
India MPs 1967–1970